Lacy Barnes (born December 23, 1964, in Ridgecrest, California) is a former track and field athlete. She was the United States women's discus throw track and field champion in 1988 and 1991 and the top U.S. finisher in the 1996 Atlanta Olympics.

Barnes studied at California State University, Fresno, competing for the track team. Barnes earned a Ph.D. in psychology from Claremont Graduate University in 2010. In 2000, she was inducted into the Fresno County Athletic Hall of Fame. She resides in Fresno County and is a psychology professor at Madera Community College in Madera, California.

Barnes married Matthew Mileham, a fellow Fresno State track team member who competed in the hammer throw for Great Britain in the 1984 and 1988 Olympics. She divorced Mileham in October 2009, and  remarried in November of 2013 to architect and sculptor Marvin Armstrong.

International competitions

References

External links
 Lacy Barnes-Mileham at USATF
 
 
 

1964 births
Living people
Track and field athletes from California
People from Ridgecrest, California
American female discus throwers
Olympic track and field athletes of the United States
Athletes (track and field) at the 1996 Summer Olympics
Pan American Games medalists in athletics (track and field)
Athletes (track and field) at the 1991 Pan American Games
World Athletics Championships athletes for the United States
Fresno State Bulldogs women's track and field athletes
People from Fresno County, California
Pan American Games bronze medalists for the United States
Medalists at the 1991 Pan American Games